A  is a Jewish prayer used to request a blessing from God. Dating to the 10th or 11th century CE,  prayers are used for a wide variety of purposes. In contemporary Judaism, a  serves as the main prayer of healing, particularly among liberal Jews, to whose rituals it has become central. Liberal Jews often use Debbie Friedman's Hebrew–English version of the prayer, which she and her then-partner, Rabbi Drorah Setel, wrote in 1987 in response to the AIDS crisis; released in 1989 on the album And You Shall Be a Blessing and spread through performances at Jewish conferences, the song became Friedman's best-known work and reversed a longstanding tradition in the Reform movement against communal prayers for health. Friedman and Setel's version and others like it, born of a time when HIV was almost always fatal, emphasize spiritual renewal rather than just physical rehabilitation.

For the congregation 

In the context of Ashkenazi liturgy, the traditional  has been described as either the third  prayer or as an additional prayer recited after the two Yekum Purkan prayers. The three prayers date to Babylonia in the 10th or 11th century CE, with the —a Hebrew prayer—being a later addition to the other two, which are in Aramaic.

Both Ashkenazi and Sephardi Jews traditionally recite the prayer on Shabbat immediately after the  during the Torah service; Sephardim also recite it on Yom Kippur. The  is often recited in the vernacular language of a congregation rather than in Hebrew. In Jewish Worship (1971), Abraham Ezra Millgram says that this is because of the prayer's "direct appeal to the worshipers and the ethical responsibilities it spells out for the people".

Specialized versions 
The  also came to serve as a template for prayers for specific blessings, and for a time was sometimes prefixed with "" ('May it be your will'). Gregg Drinkwater in American Jewish History identifies a five-part structure to such prayers: 1) "" and an invocation of the patriarchs; 2) the name of the person to bless; 3) the reason they should be blessed; 4) what is requested for the person; and 5) the community's response. William Cutter writes in Sh'ma:
There are  prayers for every kind of illness, and almost every kind of relationship; there are  prayers for people who refrain from gossip, for people who maintain responsible business ethics. There are  blessings for everyone in the community, but slanderers, gossips, and schlemiels are excluded.

For olim 

Historically, in exchange for a donation, an  could have a blessing said for someone else as well. The practice expanded to Sabbat services by the 1200s, in part because it served as a source of income, and in turn spread to other countries, becoming the most important part of the service for less educated Jews but also causing services to run long, at the expense of the Torah reading itself.

As a prayer of healing 

Macy Nulman's Encyclopedia of Jewish Prayer ties the tradition of blessing the sick back to   Such prayers traditionally refer to the sick person by matronym rather than patronym, which kabbalists teach evokes more compassion from God, citing Psalms 86:16, "Turn to me and have mercy on me; ... and deliver the son of Your maidservant".

Influenced by German ideals, early Reform Jews in the United States saw healing as a matter for private, rather than communal prayer. Prayer healing became less popular as medicine modernized, and many Reform Jews came to see healing as a purely scientific matter. The Union Prayer Book, published in 1895 and last revised in 1940, lacked any  for healing, rather limiting itself to a single line praying to "comfort the sorrowing and cheer the silent sufferers". While the 1975 Reform prayerbook Gates of Prayer was more flexible than its predecessor and restored some older practices, it also had no  for healing.

A few years into the pandemic, Congregation Sha'ar Zahav, a Reform congregation in San Francisco that used its own gender-neutral, gay-inclusive siddur (prayerbook), began a communal  written by Garry Koenigsburg and Rabbi Yoel Kahn, praying to heal "all the ill amongst us, and all who have been touched by AIDS and related illness". As there was at the time no effective treatment for HIV/AIDS, and Jewish tradition says that prayers should not be in vain, Sha'ar Zahav's version emphasized spiritual healing as well as physical. At the gay and lesbian synagogue Beth Chayim Chadashim in Los Angeles, a 1985 siddur supervised by Rabbi Janet Marder included several prayers for healing, including a  blessing the full congregation with health, success, and forgiveness.

Friedman and Setel's version 

Debbie Friedman was part of a wave of Jewish folk singers that began in the 1960s. Throughout the 1980s, as she lost many friends to AIDS and separately several to cancer, she traveled across the country performing at sickbeds. From 1984 to 1987, she lived with Rabbi Drorah Setel, then her romantic partner, who worked with AIDS Project Los Angeles.

Like the Sha'ar Zahav , Friedman and Setel's version emphasized spiritual healing in the face of a disease which most at the time were unlikely to survive. ('full healing') was defined as the renewal, rather than repair, of body and spirit. Using a mix of Hebrew and English, a trend begun by Friedman in the 1970s, the two chose to include the Jewish matriarchs as well as the patriarchs to "express the empowerment of those reciting and hearing the prayer". After the initial "" ('May the one who blessed our fathers'), they added "" ('source of blessing for our mothers'). Friedman and Setel then reversed "" and "" in the second Hebrew verse in order to avoid gendering God.

Friedman and Setel wrote the prayer in October 1987. Friedman included the song on her albums And You Shall Be a Blessing (1989) and Renewal of Spirit (1995) and performed it at Jewish conferences including those of the Coalition for the Advancement of Jewish Education, through which it spread to Jewish communities across the United States. "Mi Shebeirach" became Friedman's most popular song. She performed it at almost every concert, prefacing it with "This is for you" before singing it once on her own and then once with the audience.

Analysis 

The prayer uses the Š-L-M root, the same used in the Hebrew word shalom ('peace').

Friedman and Setel's setting has drawn particular praise, including for its bilingual nature, which makes it at once traditional and accessible. It is one of several Friedman pieces that have been called "musical midrash". Lyrically, through asking God to "help us find the courage to make our lives a blessing", it emphasizes the agency of the person praying.

Use 

The  of healing was added to the Reform siddur Mishkan T'filah in 2007, comprising a three-sentence blessing in Hebrew and English praying for a "complete renewal of body and spirit" for those who are ill, and the lyrics to Friedman and Setel's version. By the time it was added, it had already become, according to Drinkwater, "ubiquitous in Reform settings ... and in many non-Reform settings throughout the world." Drinkwater casts it as "the emotional highlight of synagogue services for countless Jews." Elyse Frishman, Mishkan T'filah editor, described including it as a "crystal clear" choice and that Friedmn's setting had already been "canonized". The prayer is now seen as central to liberal Jewish ritual.

In time this practice has diminished, as healing has been more incorporated into other aspects of Jewish life. Many synagogues maintain " lists" of names to read on Shabbat. Some Jews include on preoperative checklists that they should be added to their congregations'  lists. The lists also serve to make the community aware that someone is ill, which can be beneficial but can also present problems in cases of stigmatized illnesses. In some congregations, congregants with ill loved ones line up and the rabbi says the prayer. In more liberal ones, the rabbi will ask congregants to list names, and the congregant will then sing either the traditional  for healing or Friedman and Setel's version. Sometimes congregants wrap one another in tallitot (prayer shawls) or hold shawls above one another. 

The prayer is often used in Jewish chaplaincy and has been used by healthcare providers. A number of versions exist for specific roles and scenarios in healthcare.

Friedman died of pneumonia in 2011 after two decades of chronic illness; many North American congregations sang her "Mi Shebeirach" as she lay dying. Setel wrote in The Jewish Daily Forward that, while people's  prayers for Friedman "did not prevent Debbie's death, ... neither were they offered in vain".

Other contexts 

Other  prayers include those to be recited:

 Upon a child's birth
 For a bar or bat mitzvah
 For a brit milah (circumcision)
 For a 70th birthday
 In anticipation of a marriage and for newlyweds
 For a 25th or 50th wedding anniversary
 During the Ten Days of Penitence
 For those fasting during the Fast of Behav
 For those who do not converse during prayer (dating to Rabbi Yom-Tov Lipmann Heller during the Cossack riots)
 For one who converts to Judaism or returns after apostasy
 In a variety of more specialized settings, such as in Israel for members of the Israel Defense Forces

Notes

References

Citations

Sources 
Liturgical sources

  
 
 
 
 
 
 Audio and lyrics: 
  
 
 

Book and journal sources

 
 
 
 
 
 
 
 
 
 
 
 
 
 

Other sources

External links
Susan Colin - Mi Shebeirach, 2010 version

Jewish prayer and ritual texts
LGBT and Judaism
Reform Judaism
Religion and HIV/AIDS